Arsen Kasa (born 2 May 1997) is an Albanian professional footballer who plays as a midfielder for Albanian club AF Elbasani

Career statistics

References

External links
Arsen Kasa at FSHF

1997 births
Living people
Footballers from Elbasan
Albanian footballers
People from Elbasan County
Association football midfielders
KF Elbasani players
Luftëtari Gjirokastër players
KS Pogradeci players
Kategoria e Parë players
Kategoria Superiore players